Polanowice  is a village in the administrative district of Gmina Słomniki, within Kraków County, Lesser Poland Voivodeship, in southern Poland.

The village has a population of 687.

References

See also
 The Lesser Polish Way

Polanowice